The 2011 ACB Playoffs was the final phase of the 2010–11 ACB season. It started on May 19, 2011, and will end in June 2011. Caja Laboral were the current title holders, but were eliminated by Regal FC Barcelona in semifinals. Regal FC Barcelona won their 16th title.

Bracket

Quarterfinals
The quarterfinals are best-of-3 series.

Regal FC Barcelona vs. Unicaja

Caja Laboral vs. Gran Canaria 2014

Real Madrid vs. Baloncesto Fuenlabrada

Power Electronics Valencia vs. Bilbao Basket

Semifinals
The semifinals are best-of-5 series.

Regal FC Barcelona vs. Caja Laboral

Real Madrid vs. Bilbao Basket

Finals
The finals are best-of-5 series.

Regal FC Barcelona vs Bilbao Basket

ACB Finals MVP:  Juan Carlos Navarro

References
ACB.com

Liga ACB playoffs
Playoffs